Lyakhovo is the name of several rural localities in Russia, all of them listed here:
Lyakhovo, Karmaskalinsky District, Republic of Bashkortostan, a village in Podlubovsky Selsoviet of Karmaskalinsky District of the Republic of Bashkortostan
Lyakhovo, Yermekeyevsky District, Republic of Bashkortostan, a village in Spartaksky Selsoviet of Yermekeyevsky District of the Republic of Bashkortostan
Lyakhovo, Domodedovo, Moscow Oblast, a village under the administrative jurisdiction of the Domodedovo Town Under Oblast Jurisdiction, Moscow Oblast
Lyakhovo, Odintsovsky District, Moscow Oblast, a village under the administrative jurisdiction of the Town of Kubinka in Odintsovsky District of Moscow Oblast
Lyakhovo, Orekhovo-Zuyevsky District, Moscow Oblast, a village in Davydovskoye Rural Settlement of Orekhovo-Zuyevsky District of Moscow Oblast
Lyakhovo, Stupinsky District, Moscow Oblast, a village in Leontyevskoye Rural Settlement of Stupinsky District of Moscow Oblast
Lyakhovo, Nizhny Novgorod, Nizhny Novgorod Oblast, a village under the administrative jurisdiction of Prioksky City District of the city of oblast significance of Nizhny Novgorod, Nizhny Novgorod Oblast
Lyakhovo, Balakhninsky District, Nizhny Novgorod Oblast, a settlement under the administrative jurisdiction of the work settlement of Bolshoye Kozino in Balakhninsky District of Nizhny Novgorod Oblast
Lyakhovo, Pskov Oblast, a village in Velikoluksky District of Pskov Oblast
Lyakhovo, Glinkovsky District, Smolensk Oblast, a village in Belokholmskoye Rural Settlement of Glinkovsky District of Smolensk Oblast
Lyakhovo, Krasninsky District, Smolensk Oblast, a village in Neykovskoye Rural Settlement of Krasninsky District of Smolensk Oblast
Lyakhovo, Velizhsky District, Smolensk Oblast, a village under the administrative jurisdiction of Velizhskoye Urban Settlement in Velizhsky District of Smolensk Oblast
Lyakhovo, Andreapolsky District, Tver Oblast, a village in Andreapolsky District, Tver Oblast
Lyakhovo, Bezhetsky District, Tver Oblast, a village in Bezhetsky District, Tver Oblast
Lyakhovo, Kashinsky District, Tver Oblast, a village in Kashinsky District, Tver Oblast
Lyakhovo, Rameshkovsky District, Tver Oblast, a village in Rameshkovsky District, Tver Oblast
Lyakhovo, Staritsky District, Tver Oblast, a village in Staritsky District, Tver Oblast
Lyakhovo, Torzhoksky District, Tver Oblast, a village in Torzhoksky District, Tver Oblast
Lyakhovo, Borisoglebsky District, Yaroslavl Oblast, a village in Andreyevsky Rural Okrug of Borisoglebsky District of Yaroslavl Oblast
Lyakhovo, Nekrasovsky District, Yaroslavl Oblast, a village in Klimovsky Rural Okrug of Nekrasovsky District of Yaroslavl Oblast